Kyle Katarn is a fictional character in the Star Wars expanded universe, who appears in the five video games of the Jedi Knight series, the video game Star Wars: Lethal Alliance, and in several books and other material. In the Jedi Knight series, Katarn debuts in Star Wars: Dark Forces, appears in Star Wars Jedi Knight: Dark Forces II, is one of two playable characters in Star Wars Jedi Knight: Mysteries of the Sith, appears in Star Wars Jedi Knight II: Jedi Outcast and is a major NPC in Star Wars Jedi Knight: Jedi Academy.

Katarn was originally a member of the Galactic Empire, before becoming a mercenary for hire. He regularly worked for the Rebel Alliance and later became a member of the New Republic as well as a skilled Jedi and an instructor at the Jedi Academy, second only to Luke Skywalker.

Katarn has been well received by most critics, with GameSpot including him in a vote for the greatest video game character of all time, where he was eliminated in round two, when facing Lara Croft.

Appearances

Jedi Knight series
Katarn first appeared in Star Wars: Dark Forces, where he was introduced as a former Imperial officer who became a mercenary-for-hire after learning the Empire was responsible for the death of his father. As a mercenary, he regularly worked for the Rebel Alliance, where he was secretly dispatched by Mon Mothma on missions deemed too dangerous or sensitive for actual Rebel operatives. The game begins shortly before the events of the film A New Hope, with Katarn single-handedly infiltrating an Imperial facility on the planet Danuta to retrieve the plans for the first Death Star. The plans would eventually be forwarded to Princess Leia, leading to the destruction of the Death Star. One year later, Katarn is employed to investigate the "Dark Trooper" project, a secret Imperial research initiative manufacturing powerful robotic stormtroopers to attack Alliance strongholds. After several adventures (including encounters with Jabba the Hutt and Boba Fett), Katarn terminates the Dark Trooper Project and kills its creator, General Rom Mohc, aboard his flagship, the Arc Hammer.

Star Wars Jedi Knight: Dark Forces II takes place one year after the events of the film, Return of the Jedi. It begins with 8t88, an information droid, telling Katarn about the Dark Jedi Jerec, who killed Katarn's father, Morgan, in his efforts to find the Valley of the Jedi, a focal point for Jedi power and a Jedi burial ground. 8t88 also tells Katarn of a data disk recovered from Morgan after his death which can only be translated by a droid in Morgan's home. After 8t88 leaves Katarn to be killed, Katarn escapes, tracks down 8t88 and recovers the disk. He then heads to his home planet of Sulon and has the disk translated. The disk contains a message from Morgan, telling Katarn he must pursue the ways of the Jedi, and giving him a lightsaber. Katarn also learns that seven Dark Jedi are attempting to use the power found in the Valley to rebuild the Empire. Kyle eventually kills all seven Dark Jedi and saves the Valley.

Star Wars Jedi Knight: Mysteries of the Sith, an expansion pack for Dark Forces II, takes place approximately five years later. The game focuses on former Imperial assassin Mara Jade, who has come under Kyle's tutelage as she trains to be a Jedi. During this period, while investigating Sith ruins on Dromund Kaas, Kyle comes under the influence of the Dark Side of the Force, but Jade is able to turn him back to the Light.

Star Wars Jedi Knight II: Jedi Outcast is set three years after Mysteries of the Sith. Feeling vulnerable to another fall to the Dark Side, Kyle has chosen to forsake the Force and has returned to his former mercenary ways. Whilst on a mission for Mon Mothma, Kyle's partner, Jan Ors is apparently murdered at the hands of two Dark Jedi, Desann and Tavion. Determined to avenge her death, Katarn returns to the Valley of the Jedi to regain his connection to the Force. Taking back his lightsaber from Luke Skywalker, he sets out to track down Desann. After escaping from a trap with Lando Calrissian's help, Katarn heads to Cloud City and interrogates Tavion, who tells him that Jan is not dead at all. Desann simply pretended to kill her knowing Katarn would return to the Valley, at which point Desann followed him so as to infuse his soldiers with the Force and reinstall the Imperial Remnant as rulers of the galaxy. Katarn spares Tavion's life and stows away on Desann's ship, the Doomgiver. After rescuing Jan, Katarn defeats the military scientist, Galak Fyyar, who tells him that Desann plans to use his Jedi infused soldiers to attack the Jedi Academy on Yavin IV. Katarn enters the Academy and defeats Desann. After the battle, he tells Luke Skywalker that he is going to stay a Jedi, confident of his strength and dedication to the Light Side.

Star Wars Jedi Knight: Jedi Academy takes place a year after Jedi Outcast, and is the first game in the series in which Katarn is not a playable character. The game begins as he is appointed master of two new students, Jaden Korr and Rosh Penin. Rosh soon begins to feel held back and comes to resent Katarn. It is soon discovered that a Sith cult named the Disciples of Ragnos are stealing Force energy from various locations across the galaxy via a scepter. Along with others, Katarn and his students embark on a number of missions in an effort to discover what the cult are hoping to do with the powers they steal. During one such mission, while investigating the ruins of the planet formerly known as Byss, Rosh is captured and converted to the Dark Side by the cult's leader, Tavion (Desann's former apprentice). Jaden and Katarn escape and conclude that Tavion is storing the stolen Dark Force energy in the scepter in order to use it to resurrect an ancient Sith master, Marka Ragnos. After receiving a distress message from Rosh, who has returned to the Light Side and is now a prisoner, Katarn and Jaden go to rescue him, only to discover that the distress signal was a scheme to lure the two in. After defeating Rosh, Jaden is confronted with a choice: kill him and turn to the Dark Side, or spare him and remain on the Light Side. If the player kills Rosh, the game ends with Jaden killing Tavion, taking the scepter and fleeing, with Katarn heading out in pursuit. If the player chooses not to kill Rosh, the game ends with Jaden killing Tavion and defeating the spirit of Ragnos.

Star Wars literature
In The New Jedi Order series of novels, Katarn becomes the Jedi Academy's foremost battlemaster, a close friend of Luke Skywalker, and a respected Jedi Master. During the Yuuzhan Vong invasion, Katarn helps develop strategies to use against the invaders, and participates in the rescue of human captives from the Imperial Remnant world Ord Sedra. Near the end of the war, the living planet Zonama Sekot agrees to help the Republic; Katarn is one of several Jedi Knights who bonds to seed-partners and is provided with Sekotan starships to use in Sekot's defence.

During Troy Denning's The Dark Nest trilogy (The Joiner King, The Unseen Queen and The Swarm War), Katarn is one of four Jedi Masters who attempts to destroy the Dark Nest. Katarn also speaks his mind during a Master's Council session, where he stands up to Chief of State Cal Omas. He, along with Corran Horn and other Masters, believe that Jaina Solo and Zekk could be the next leaders of the Dark Nest. In The Swarm War (the final part of the trilogy), Katarn leads a squadron of Jedi Stealth X's against the Killiks.

Katarn also appears in Karen Traviss' Legacy of the Force novels Bloodlines, Sacrifice, Exile and Fury, as a Jedi Master participating in Council meetings. In Bloodlines, he helps to point out the "embarrassment" to the Jedi Order of Jacen Solo's actions in apprehending Corellians on Coruscant.  In Exile, he plays devil's advocate regarding Leia Organa's supposed betrayal of the Galactic Alliance, although he reasserts his loyalty to Leia by being the first to formally declare his faith in her at the meeting's conclusion. Katarn plays a much larger role in Fury, leading a team of Jedi against Jacen Solo in a capture-or-kill mission. After a fierce four-way lightsaber duel, Katarn is severely wounded and the mission ends in failure.

Other appearances
Katarn's adventures are also told in three hardcover graphic story albums written by William C. Dietz, which were adapted into audio dramatizations; Soldier for the Empire, Rebel Agent and Jedi Knight.

Katarn also appears in the Star Wars Roleplaying Game and is a premiere figure of "The New Jedi Order" faction in the Wizards of the Coast Star Wars Miniatures. The Wizards of the Coast web series, The Dark Forces Saga, highlights his background, as well as those of most of the other heroes and villains found in the games.

He also appears in the video game Star Wars: Empire at War, where he can be used in the 'Skirmish' battle mode as a special 'hero' unit. The game is set between Episode III and Episode IV, and, as such, Katarn cannot use force powers.

The popularity of characters from Dark Forces resulted in LucasArts licensing toys based on the game. Hasbro produced Kyle Katarn and Dark Trooper toys, which are among the few Expanded Universe items to be turned into action figures.

Katarn was made non-canon in 2014, following the acquisition of Lucasfilm by Disney. However, he was later recanonized by Star Wars: The Card Game in 2016.

On November 24, 2021, Katarn was released as a playable character in Star Wars: Galaxy of Heroes.

Development and depiction
Originally, the protagonist of Dark Forces was to be Luke Skywalker. However the developers of the game realized that this would add constraints to gameplay and storyline, and instead a new character, Kyle Katarn, was created. For Jedi Academy, an early decision made during development was whether or not to have Kyle Katarn as the playable character. This was due to the character already being a powerful Jedi Knight, and, as such, starting off with the force skills would affect the gameplay. To resolve this issue, the developers chose to make the playable character a student in the Jedi Academy. Katarn was then made an instructor in the academy and integral to the plot to ensure that Jedi Academy built upon the existing Jedi Knight series storyline.

Katarn was voiced by Nick Jameson in Star Wars: Dark Forces. He was portrayed by Jason Court in the full motion video sequences of Dark Forces II. The in-game model was modeled after Court to maintain consistency. In Mysteries of the Sith, Jedi Outcast and Jedi Academy, Katarn's appearance is exclusively a polygonal model, without any FMV scenes, in which he is designed to look like a slightly older Court. In Mysteries of the Sith, he is voiced by Rino Romano, and in the two subsequent games by Jeff Bennett. For the audio dramatizations, he is portrayed by Randal Berger. In Pendant Productions' Blue Harvest, Katarn is voiced by Scott Barry.

Reception
Previewing the PlayStation version of Star Wars: Dark Forces, Electronic Gaming Monthly called Katarn "a perfect character to star in a first-person shoot-'em-up in the Star Wars universe", and said the character has the same rogue-with-a-heart appeal as Han Solo.

GameDaily's Robert Workman listed Katarn as one of his favourite Star Wars video game characters. IGN placed him as their 22nd top Star Wars character, praising him as "a gamer's reliable blank state," a feature which they felt made him one of the most "human" Star Wars characters. They also stated that Katarn's endearance with fans was because of his "mishmash of quirks and dispositions." In 2009, IGN's Jesse Schedeen argued that the character should not appear in the then upcoming Star Wars live-action TV series, feeling that "Katarn isn't very interesting without his Jedi abilities," and that deeply exploring his past was not really warranted. Schedeen also included Katarn as one of his favourite Star Wars heroes and video game sword masters. In GameSpot's vote for the all-time greatest videogame hero, Katarn was eliminated in round two when he faced Lara Croft, garnering 27.5% of the votes. In round one he defeated Dig Dug, with 67.6% of the votes.

On the other hand, GamesRadar was critical of Katarn, calling him the third worst character in video gaming, saying "he's bearded, he's boring, he's bland and his name is Kyle Katarn," comparing his outfit to that of a "beige-obsessed disco cowboy." They also commented that while "originally a genuinely interesting character in the Han Solo mold," they felt that the character had become "emotionless" after he gained force powers.

References

External links

Star Wars: Jedi Knight
Star Wars Legends characters
Star Wars video game characters
Star Wars Jedi characters
Fictional commanders
Fictional defectors
Fictional knights in video games
Fictional revolutionaries
Fictional mercenaries in video games
Fictional soldiers in video games
Fictional swordfighters in video games
First-person shooter characters
Male characters in video games
Video game characters introduced in 1995
Nobility characters in video games